Oberhoffen may refer to one of two communes in the Bas-Rhin department in Alsace in north-eastern France:

Oberhoffen-lès-Wissembourg
Oberhoffen-sur-Moder